Ovsiše is a village in the Municipality of Radovljica in the Upper Carniola region of Slovenia. The village church is dedicated to Saint Nicholas.

Name
Ovsiše was attested in historical sources as Harlant in 1291, and as Haberlandt and Ousischo in 1481.

References

External links
Ovsiše at Geopedia

Populated places in the Municipality of Radovljica